The $1,000,000 Reward is a 1920 American drama film serial directed by George Lessey and produced by Harry Grossman. This is now considered to be a lost film, as there are no available copies of it.

Cast
 Lillian Walker as Betty Thorndyke
 Coit Albertson as Morgan Spencer
 Charles B. Middleton as William Russell
 George Lessey as James Bradley (credited as George A. Lessey)
 Joe Smith Marba as Kenwah (credited as Joseph Marba)
 Leora Spellman as Valerie Kernan
 Bernard Randall as Kip Van Hoan
 William Pike as James Forsythe
 Buck Connors (credited as George Connors)
 Louise Hotaling
 Ray Allen
 Herbert Rawlinson as Man in suit
 F.W. Stewart

See also
 List of American films of 1920
 List of film serials
 List of film serials by studio
 List of lost films

References

External links

1920 films
1920 drama films
American silent serial films
American black-and-white films
Lost American films
Films directed by George Lessey
Silent American drama films
1920 lost films
Lost drama films
1920s American films